The Rough Guide to Classic Jazz is a jazz compilation album originally released in 1997. Part of the World Music Network Rough Guides series, the album covers the genre's growth from the turn of the 20th century to the 1930s, largely focusing on the "Jazz Age". The compilation was produced by Phil Stanton, co-founder of the World Music Network. Curation was performed by Robert Parker, an audio engineer specializing in the period and host of the radio show Jazz Classics in Digital Stereo.

Critical reception

Keith Farley of AllMusic called it a "fine introduction". Michaelangelo Matos, writing for the Chicago Reader, claimed it "buried" the contemporaneous Swing Revival and noted his surprise at the number of "obscure white groups".

Track listing

References

External links 
 

1997 compilation albums
World Music Network Rough Guide albums